The 1948 Open Championship was the 77th Open Championship, held 30 June to 2 July at Muirfield in Gullane, East Lothian, Scotland. Henry Cotton, age 41, won his third and final Open title, five strokes ahead of runner-up and defending champion 

Qualifying took place on 28–29 June, Monday and Tuesday, with 18 holes at Muirfield and 18 holes at the number 1 course Gullane. The number of qualifiers was limited to a maximum of 100, and ties for 100th place would not qualify. 
Henry Cotton led on 138; the qualifying score was 152 and 97 players advanced. Cotton had led the qualification in 1935, the previous time the Open had been held at Muirfield.

Charlie Ward, Sam King, and Flory Van Donck shot 69 to share the first round lead. Cotton opened with a 71, then led by four strokes after a 66 in the second round, one off his own tournament record set in 1934. While scoring conditions in the first two rounds were ideal, with five other rounds of sub-70 in the second, the change in weather on the final day caused scores to soar. The maximum number of players making the cut after 36 holes was again set at 40, and ties for 40th place were not included.  The cut was at 148 (+6) and 36 players advanced.

Over the final two rounds, the lowest round was 70. Cotton carded rounds of 75-72 to set a clubhouse lead of 284 that no one came close to matching. Fred Daly came closest with a 289, five shots behind.

Roberto De Vicenzo made his Open Championship debut and finished in third place. Over the next two years he followed with another third and a runner-up finish. He won the title nineteen years later, in 1967.

Past champions in the field 

Source:

All past champions in the field made the cut.

Did not enter:
 Sam Snead (1946), Denny Shute (1933), Gene Sarazen (1932), Tommy Armour (1931).

Round summaries

First round
Wednesday, 30 June 1948

Source:

Second round
Thursday, 1 July 1948

Source:

Third round
Friday, 2 July 1948 (morning)

Source:

Final round
Friday, 2 July 1948 (afternoon)

Source:

References

External links
Muirfield 1948 (Official site)

The Open Championship
Golf tournaments in Scotland
Open Championship
Open Championship
Open Championship
Open Championship